Jeff Abbott is a former Formula Drift competitor.

Biography
Born and raised in Poughkeepsie, New York, Jeff moved out to Temecula, California to start his professional career, family, and began to take interest in the sport of drifting. He progressed through various grassroots motorsports programs in Southern California such as Just Drift, 626 Drift, and R.A.D. Experience. Jeff began driving in Formula D in 2010 driving a 1999 Mazda Miata, but withdrew in 2011 after 2 seasons.

Results

Formula D

References

External links
 
 Formula D Jeff Abbott's Profile

Drifting drivers
Formula D drivers
Living people
Sportspeople from Poughkeepsie, New York
Sportspeople from Temecula, California
Year of birth missing (living people)